is a Japanese actor, voice actor and singer. He voiced Haku in Spirited Away, Shoya Ishida in A Silent Voice, Sena Kobayakawa in Eyeshield 21, Jinta "Jintan" Yadomi  in Anohana: The Flower We Saw That Day, Syaoran in Tsubasa: Reservoir Chronicle, Yuichiro Hyakuya in Seraph of the End, Kōshi Sugawara in Haikyu!!, Nuts in Yes! PreCure 5 and its sequel GoGo!, Apollon Agana Belea in Kamigami no Asobi, and Sora in the Kingdom Hearts video game series. He released his debut mini-album Soleil on June 26, 2009, and his first single album, Faith, on November 25, 2009. In December 2016, he announced that he has gone on hiatus to study abroad, which he had been considering on that time. On September 3, 2021, he announced that he is married.

Filmography

Anime series
1996
You're Under Arrest, Sho
2001
PaRappa the Rapper, Parappa
2002
Ghost in the Shell: Stand Alone Complex (2002-10-01), Masukā Omba
2003
Cromartie High School, Osamu Kido
D.N.Angel, Daisuke Niwa
Wolf's Rain, Hasu
2004
Fafner in the Azure, Kōyō Kasugai
Kurau Phantom Memory, Ivon
Madlax, Chris
Windy Tales, Jun
Zipang, Young Yosuke
2005
Eyeshield 21, Sena Kobayakawa
Starship Operators, Shimei Yuuki
Tsubasa Reservoir Chronicles, Syaoran
2006
Air Gear, Nue
D. Gray-man, Narein
Futari wa Pretty Cure Splash Star, Manabu Miyasako
Gin'iro no Olynssis, Tokito Aizawa
Yomigaeru Sora - Rescue Wings, Satoshi Yoshioka
2007
Darker Than Black, Young Hei
Mobile Suit Gundam 00, Saji Crossroad
One Piece, Jiro
Yes! PreCure 5, Nuts
2008
Birdy the Mighty Decode, Tsutomu Senkawa
Kurozuka (novel), Kuon
Neo Angelique Abyss, Erenfried
Yes! PreCure 5 GoGo!, Nuts
Zettai Karen Children, Kagari Hino
2009
07 Ghost, Shuri Oak
Asura Cryin', Tomoharu Natsume
Asura Cryin' 2, Tomoharu Natsume, Naotaka Natsume
Metal Fight Beyblade, Tsubasa Otori
Cross Game, Ko Kitamura
First Love Limited, Mamoru Zaitsu
Kobato, Syaoran
Miracle Train, Takuto Kichijōji
Phantom: Requiem for the Phantom, Zwei/Reiji Azuma
Tatakau Shisho - The Book of Bantorra, Colio Tonies
2010
Naruto Shippuden, Yagura, Saiken
Nura: Rise of the Yokai Clan, Tosakamaru
Okami-san and Her Seven Companions, Ryoshi Morino
And Yet the Town Moves, Hiroyuki Sanada
Metal Fight Beyblade Baku, Tsubasa Otori
2011
Anohana: The Flower We Saw That Day, Jinta Yadomi
Fate/Zero, Kiritsugu Emiya (young)
Ground Control to Psychoelectric Girl, Makoto Niwa
Metal Fight Beyblade 4D, Tsubasa Otori
Kimi to Boku, Chizuru Tachibana
Sacred Seven, Makoto Kagami
Un-Go, Seigen Hayami
Yu-Gi-Oh! Zexal, Astral, Numbers 96
2012
Daily Lives of High School Boys, Tadakuni
Hyouka, Jirō Sugimura
Metal Fight Beyblade Zero-G,  Tsubasa Otori
Mysterious Girlfriend X, Akira Tsubaki
Naruto Shippuden, Minato Namikaze (child)
Pokémon, Masaomi, Kyohei
Tsuritama, Haru
Yu-Gi-Oh! Zexal II, Astral, Numbers 96
2013
Cuticle Detective Inaba, Kei Nozaki
Chihayafuru 2, Akihiro Tsukuba
Karneval, Yotaka
Naruto Shippuden, Yagura, Saiken
2014
Captain Earth, Daichi Manatsu
Haikyū!!, Kōshi Sugawara
Kamigami no Asobi, Apollon Agana Berea
2015
Fafner in the Azure: Exodus, Kōyō Kasugai
Haikyū!! 2, Kōshi Sugawara
Mr. Osomatsu, Todomatsu
Seraph of the End, Yūichirō Hyakuya
2016
Haikyū!! 3, Kōshi Sugawara
Mob Psycho 100, Ritsu Kageyama 
2017
Mr. Osomatsu 2, Todomatsu
2018
Amanchu! Advance, Peter
Run with the Wind, Akane Kashiwazaki
Shinya! Tensai Bakabon, Bakabon
2019
Carole & Tuesday, Roddy
Chihayafuru 3, Akihiro Tsukuba
Midnight Occult Civil Servants, Theo Himezuka
Mob Psycho 100 II, Ritsu Kageyama
Bungo Stray Dogs 3, Karma
2020
 Haikyu!! To the Top, Kōshi Sugawara
Mr. Osomatsu 3, Todomatsu Matsuno
Oda Cinnamon Nobunaga, Lis (Akechi Mitsuhide)
2021
Platinum End, Mirai Kakehashi
2022
Yurei Deco, Finn
Mob Psycho 100 III, Ritsu Kageyama

Tokusatsu
Actor
Ultraman Gaia: The Battle in Hyperspace (1999), Yu Hirama
Voice actor
Kamen Rider OOO (2010 - 2011), Ankh (Lost) (eps. 29 - 42)
Ultra Zero Fight (2013), Jean-nine
Ultraman Zero Side Story: Killer the Beatstar (2011), Jean-nine
Ultraman Geed the Movie: Connect Them! The Wishes!!  (2018), Jean-nine
Yoshihiko and the Key of Evil Spirits (2012), Emperor

Original video animation
Tsubasa Tokyo Revelations (2007), Syaoran
Saint Seiya: The Lost Canvas (2009), Hanuman Tokusa
Tsubasa: Shunraiki (2009), Syaoran
xxxHolic Shunmuki (2009), Syaoran
Air Gear: Kuro no Hane to Nemuri no Mori (2010), Kazuma "Kazu" Mikura
Zettai Karen Children (2010), Kagari Hino
Five Numbers! (2011), Young Man
Senjou no Valkyria 3: Tagatame no Juusou (2011), Zig
Code Geass: Akito the Exiled (2012), Akito Hyuga
Shinken Zemi Kōkō Kōza (2012), Shota

Original net animation
Pokémon Evolutions (2021), Hop
The Heike Story (2021), Taira no Koremori

Anime films
Spirited Away (2001), Haku
Tsubasa Chronicle the Movie: The Princess of the Country of Birdcages (2005), Syaoran
xxxHOLiC the Movie: A Midsummer Night's Dream (2005), Syaoran
Legend of Raoh: Chapter of Fierce Fight (2006), Shiba
Yes! Precure 5: Kagami no Kuni no Miracle Daibōken! (2007), Nuts
Yes! Precure 5 GoGo! Okashi no Kuni no Happy Birthday (2008), Nuts
Precure All Stars DX: Minna Tomodachi—Kiseki no Zenin Daishūgō (2009), Nuts
Precure All Stars DX2: Kibō no Hikari—Rainbow Jewel o Mamore! (2010), Nuts
Book Girl the Movie (2010), Konoha Inoune
Mobile Suit Gundam 00 the Movie: A Wakening of the Trailblazer (2010), Saji Crossroad
Metal Fight Beyblade vs the Sun: Sol Blaze, the Scorching Hot Invader (2010), Tsubasa Ootori
The Prince of Tennis: Eikoku-shiki Teikyū-jō Kessen! (2011), Peter
Children Who Chase Lost Voices (2011), Shun and Shin
Precure All-Stars DX3 Mirai ni Todoke! Sekai o Tsunagu Niji-Iro no Hana (2011), Nuts
Towa no Quon (2011), Takao
Tiger & Bunny the Movie: The Beginning (2012), Isaac
Anohana: The Flower We Saw That Day (2013), Jintan
The Garden of Words (2013), Takao Akizuki
Lupin the 3rd vs. Detective Conan: The Movie (2013), Emilio Baretti
Miss Hokusai (2015), Kagema
Gekijō-ban Haikyu!! Owari to Hajimari (2015), Kōshi Sugawara
A Silent Voice (2016), Shōya Ishida
Kizumonogatari Part 2: Nekketsu (2016), Episode
Maquia: When the Promised Flower Blooms (2018), Ariel
Mr. Osomatsu: The Movie (2019), Todomatsu Matsuno
Child of Kamiari Month (2021), Yasha
Dragon Ball Super: Super Hero (2022), Dr. Hedo
Mr. Osomatsu: Hipipo-Zoku to Kagayaku Kajitsu (2022), Todomatsu Matsuno

Video games
Kingdom Hearts (2002), Sora
Eureka Seven Vol.1: The New Wave (2005), Moondoggie
Kingdom Hearts II (2005), Sora
Everybody's Tennis (2006), Yuki
Summon Night: Twin Age (2007), Aldo
Kingdom Hearts II: Final Mix+ (2007), Sora
Kingdom Hearts Re:Chain of Memories (2007), Sora
Saikin Koi Shiteru? (2009), Sōhei Aiba
Sunday VS Magazine: Shuuketsu! Choujou Daikessen! (2009), Natsu Dragneel
Kingdom Hearts: Birth by Sleep (2010), Sora, Vanitas
God Eater Burst (2010), Karel Schneider
Kingdom Hearts Re:coded (2010), Sora
Black Robinia (2011), Kotaro Tachibana
Dragon Ball Z: Ultimate Tenkaichi (2011), Avatar: Energetic
Final Fantasy Type-0 (2011), Eight
Phantom of Inferno (2011), Zwei/Reiji Azuma, Xbox 360 Version
Valkyria Chronicles III (2011), Zig
Kingdom Hearts 3D: Dream Drop Distance (2012), Sora, Vanitas
Kingdom Hearts HD 1.5 Remix (2013), Sora
Super Robot Wars UX (2013), Koyo Kasugai
Naruto Shippuden: Ultimate Ninja Storm 3 (2013), Yagura
Sengoku Basara 4 (2014), Yamanaka Shikanosuke
Kingdom Hearts HD 2.5 Remix (2014), Sora, Vanitas
God Eater 2: Rage Burst (2015), Karel Schneider
Naruto Shippûden: Ultimate Ninja Storm Revolution (2014), Yagura
God Eater: Resurrection (2015), Karel Schneider
Final Fantasy Type-0 HD (2015), Eight
Naruto Shippuden: Ultimate Ninja Storm 4 (2016), Yagura
Osomatsusan no hesokuri wôzu (2016), Todomatsu Matsuno
Nîto sugoroku: Buraritabi (2016), Todomatsu Matsuno
Osomatsusan the Game: Hachamecha shuushoku adobaisu - Deddo oa wâku (2017), Todomatsu Matsuno
Kingdom Hearts HD 2.8 Final Chapter Prologue (2017), Sora, Vanitas
Wand of Fortune R2~Jikuu ni Shizumu Mokushiroku (2017), Est Rinaudo [PS Vita]
Shoumetsu Toshi 2 (2017), Souma [App Game]
Neo Angelique Tenshi no Namida (2017), Erenfried [PS Vita]
Kingdom Hearts III (2019), Sora, Vanitas
Super Smash Bros. Ultimate (2021), Sora
Fire Emblem Heroes (2021), Elm
Genshin Impact (2022), Cyno
Kingdom Hearts IV (TBA), Sora

Unknown date
Dragon Ball Heroes, Avatar: Saiyan (male), hero-type
Kamigami no Asobi, Apollon Agana Belea
Magic Pengel, Mono
Macross 30: The Voice that Connects the Galaxy, Leon Sagaki
Rogue Galaxy, Harry
Summon Night Craft Sword Monogatari: Hajimari no Ishi, Lemmy
SD Gundam G Generation World, Saji Crossroad
Wand of Fortune series, Est Rinaudo
Ikemen Revolution (2019), Jonah Clemence

Theatre
Anne of Green Gables, Gilbert
Fiddler on the Roof, Perchik
Titanic, Frederick Fleet
Galaxy Express 999: Galaxy Opera (2018), Tochiro Oyama

Live-action film
Mr. Osomatsu (2022), Todomatsu (voice)

TV drama
A Girl and Three Sweethearts (2016)

Dubbing roles

Live-action
Timothée Chalamet
Call Me by Your Name, Elio Perlman
Hot Summer Nights, Daniel Middleton
Beautiful Boy, Nic Sheff
Little Women, Theodore "Laurie" Laurence
Dune, Paul Atreides
Don't Look Up, Yule
The 4400, Graham Holt (Cameron Bright)
Category 6: Day of Destruction (2007 TV Tokyo edition), Garth Benson (Jeff Sutton)
The Cider House Rules, Buster (Kieran Culkin)
Clouds, Zach Sobiech (Fin Argus)
Glee, Sam Evans (Chord Overstreet)
Gully, Jesse (Kelvin Harrison Jr.)
Juno, Paulie Bleeker (Michael Cera)
Killing Eve, Hugo Tiller (Edward Bluemel)
King Arthur, young Lancelot (Elliot Henderson-Boyle)
Mystic River, young Jimmy Markum (Jason Kelly)
The Pale Blue Eye, Edgar Allan Poe (Harry Melling)
The Santa Clause 2, Charlie Calvin (Eric Lloyd)
Savage Grace, Antony Baekeland (Eddie Redmayne)
The Thirteenth Year, Jess Wheatley (Justin Jon Ross)
Thumbsucker, Justin Cobb (Lou Taylor Pucci)
Willow, Prince Graydon (Tony Revolori)

Animation
My Little Pony: Equestria Girls – Legend of Everfree, Timber Spruce
Next Avengers: Heroes of Tomorrow (Disney XD edition), James Rogers
Recess, Vince LaSalle (first voice)
Underdogs, Capi

Music career 

On 06/24/2009, Irino made his debut as an artist under Kiramune label with his first mini album「Soleil」.Irino is one of the first Kiramune's artists. He released the 1st single 「Faith」on the same year.

References

External links
 Official agency profile 
  
 Miyu Irino at GamePlaza-Haruka Voice Acting Database 
 Miyu Irino at Hitoshi Doi's Seiyuu Database 
 

1988 births
Living people
Japanese male child actors
Japanese male pop singers
Japanese male video game actors
Japanese male voice actors
Male voice actors from Tokyo
20th-century Japanese male actors
21st-century Japanese male actors